Albert Sutton may refer to:

 Albert Sutton (1866–1923), partner in the architecture firm Sutton & Whitney, based in Portland, Oregon, United States
 Albert Sutton (politician) (1874–1946), Australian politician